Derrick Samuel Alston Jr. (born September 17, 1997) is an American professional basketball player for the Rostock Seawolves of the Basketball Bundesliga. He played college basketball for the Boise State Broncos.

Early life and high school career
Alston worked as a ball boy for the Houston Rockets of the National Basketball Association, grabbing rebounds for players during warmups. Alston attended Strake Jesuit College Preparatory in Houston, where he played varsity basketball for two years. As a senior, he averaged 14.6 points and 5.1 rebounds per game, earning first-team All-District 19-6A honors. Alston received attention from several NCAA Division II schools but did not have any NCAA Division I offers, with some programs suggesting that he complete a postgraduate season. He was convinced to work his way to a basketball scholarship at Boise State after a junior college coach sent film of Alston to the Bronco's coaching staff.

College career
Alston was invited to walk on to Boise State after impressing the team's coaching staff. When he joined Boise State, he stood 6'9" and weighed 148 pounds. Alston redshirted his first year and reached a weight of 170 pounds by the start of his next season. As a freshman, he averaged 0.6 points per game in limited playing time. He began earning more minutes during his sophomore season due to his work ethic as well as the departure of Chandler Hutchison to the NBA. On February 9, 2019, Alston scored a career-high 33 points, shooting 12-of-15 from the field, along with four rebounds and four assists in a 105–57 win over San Jose State. In his sophomore season, he averaged 13.4 points and 3.9 rebounds per game and was an All-Mountain West honorable mention selection. His increase in points per game from the previous season ranked first in school history and second in the nation. Before his junior season, he earned a scholarship to play for Boise State. On December 23, 2019, Alston scored a season-high 32 points to go with six assists in an 85–69 victory over Portland at the Diamond Head Classic. As a junior, he averaged 17.3 points, 5.2 rebounds and 3.1 assists per game, earning second-team All-Mountain West accolades. On April 7, 2020, Alston announced that he would enter the 2020 NBA draft, while maintaining his college eligibility. On July 8, Alston announced that he would be returning to Boise State for his final season.

Professional career
After going undrafted in the 2021 NBA draft, Alston joined the Golden State Warriors for the 2021 NBA Summer League. On September 13, 2021, he signed with the Utah Jazz. He was waived prior to the start of the season. In October 2021, Alston joined the Salt Lake City Stars as an affiliate player.

Alston joined the Dallas Mavericks for the 2022 NBA Summer League.

On August 15, 2022, he has signed with Rostock Seawolves of the easyCredit BBL. On January 28, 2023, Alston's NBA G League rights were traded from the Iowa Wolves to the Long Island Nets in exchange for Craig Randall II.

Career statistics

College

|-
| style="text-align:left;"| 2016–17
| style="text-align:left;"| Boise State
| style="text-align:center;" colspan="11"|  Redshirt
|-
| style="text-align:left;"| 2017–18
| style="text-align:left;"| Boise State
| 11 || 0 || 2.4 || .429 || .500 || .000 || .5 || .2 || .1 || .0 || .6
|-
| style="text-align:left;"| 2018–19
| style="text-align:left;"| Boise State
| 33 || 21 || 27.9 || .485 || .384 || .819 || 3.9 || 1.1 || .4 || .4 || 13.4
|-
| style="text-align:left;"| 2019–20
| style="text-align:left;"| Boise State
| 32 || 30 || 33.0 || .413 || .335 || .808 || 5.2 || 3.1 || .5 || .3 || 17.3
|-
| style="text-align:left;"| 2020–21
| style="text-align:left;"| Boise State
| 28 || 28 || 32.5 || .444 || .382 || .856 || 3.7 || 2.2 || .8 || .3 || 17.0
|- class="sortbottom"
| style="text-align:center;" colspan="2"| Career
| 104 || 79 || 28.0 || .443 || .365 || .821 || 3.9 || 1.9 || .5 || .3 || 14.2

Personal life
Alston's father, Derrick Alston, played in the National Basketball Association (NBA) for three years before playing professional basketball overseas for 16 years. Derrick Sr. later coached in the NBA and the NBA G League and currently serves as head coach for the Westchester Knicks of the G League.

References

External links
Boise State Broncos bio

1997 births
Living people
American men's basketball players
Basketball players from Houston
Boise State Broncos men's basketball players
Rostock Seawolves players
Salt Lake City Stars players
Shooting guards
Small forwards